Lake Medora is a lake located on US Highway 41 in Keweenaw County, Michigan, near Grant and Eagle Harbor Townships.

See also
List of lakes in Michigan

References

Bodies of water of Keweenaw County, Michigan
Medora